Beer style is a term used to differentiate and categorize beers by various factors, including appearance, flavour, ingredients, production method, history, or origin. The term beer style and the structuring of world beers into defined categories is largely based on work done by writer Michael James Jackson in his 1977 book The World Guide To Beer. Fred Eckhardt furthered Jackson's work, publishing The Essentials of Beer Style in 1989.

There is no universally agreed list of beer styles, as different countries and organisations have different sets of criteria. Organisers of beer competitions such as the Campaign for Real Ale's (CAMRA) Champion Beer of Britain, the Beer Judge Certification Program (BJCP) local homebrewing competitions, the Brewers Association's World Beer Cup, and the Brewing Industry International Awards have categories in which beers are judged. The categories are varied and include processes or ingredients not usually regarded as defining beer styles in themselves, such as cask ale or gluten-free beer.

Beer terms such as ale or lager cover a wide variety of beer styles, and are better thought of as broad categories of beer styles. A number of ethnic beers, such as chhaang and cauim, are generally not included on beer style groupings.

Classic styles

Hybrid and specialty styles

Origin

An alternative approach is to categorize beers by the country or region from which they originated. Both the Brewers Association and the Beer Judge Certification Program (BJCP) group their beer styles in this way. Beers that originated in a particular country or region may be subsequently produced in other countries, e.g. British style ales are now brewed in North America.

Other fermented drinks based on cereals

A number of ethnic beers or other fermented drinks based on cereals are generally not included on beer style groupings. They are included here for completeness.

Bouza
Boza
Bozo
Braggot, Also called bracket or brackett. Ingredients consist of honey and malted grains with spices or hops. Welsh origin (bragawd).
Cauim
Chhaang
Chicha
Gotlandsdricka
Gruit
Kvass
Oshikundu
Podpiwek
Purl
Sahti
 Sato (rice wine), also called  (jug alcohol) when home-brewed in jugs
 Sulima, made by the Mosuo people in the Lijiang region of Yunnan, China

See also
 Grisette (beer) – a farmhouse ale that originated on the border of Belgium and France

References

Bibliography
Michael Jackson's Great Beer Guide, Michael Jackson, 

 L